FAircraft
This is a list of aircraft used by the Imperial Japanese Army and Imperial Japanese Navy during World War II.

Fighters

Attack Aircraft

Bombers

Reconnaissance Aircraft

Trainers 

World War II Imperial Japanese Navy trainer aircraft were frequently modified from operational aircraft and differentiated by the suffix letter "K". Japanese training aircraft were red-orange where combat aircraft would have been camouflaged.

Transports 

A total of 85611 aircraft were produced by Japan in WW2.

Experimental Aircraft

References

 
World War II, aircraft
Aircraft
Japan